Jordan Scott Bannister (born 31 October 1982) is a former Australian rules football player and umpire, who played for Carlton and Essendon and umpired in the Australian Football League.

Playing career
Bannister made his debut for the Essendon Football Club in Round 12, 2001 against Adelaide. He was delisted by Essendon at the end of the 2003 season, and decided to re-nominate for the national draft, where he was selected by the Carlton Football Club with its sixth round selection (#69 overall). He made his debut there in Round 1, 2004 against Fremantle. He was noted as a hard-running defender, often taking tagging roles on mobile forwards, and he polled two Brownlow Medal votes against Collingwood in a shut down role against Nathan Buckley. He struggled for regular selection in 2005, finally breaking through for a regular berth in mid-2006, playing ten out of eleven games before being suspended by the AFL Tribunal.

Bannister began the 2007 season playing with Carlton's , the Northern Bullants, and it appeared that he would struggle for selection under Carlton's youth policy. He was brought back to the seniors against the hard-running Western Bulldogs, and made an immediate impact with consecutive shut-downs of Brad Johnson and Chad Cornes, ensuring his position in the team for the rest of the year. He played the first five games of 2008, but was struck down by injury and was unable to regain his position in the team for the rest of the year. In 2009, Bannister was unable to break into the Carlton senior team on a regular basis, playing only two games for the year. He was a member of the Bullants' losing grand final team in 2009. Bannister was delisted from the Carlton Football Club at the end of the 2009 season.

Umpiring career
Following retirement from playing, Bannister pursued umpiring under the AFL's Player Pathway Program. He umpired at metropolitan and country level for most of 2010 but was appointed to his senior VFL debut in Round 17. Formally added to the VFL list in 2011 he umpired 15 senior matches and the VFL Reserves elimination final that year.

Successfully trialing in the 2012 pre-season, Bannister was appointed to the AFL list of umpires for 2012 in the specially created 33rd position reserved for player pathway umpires. He officiated in his first AFL match in Round 1, between North Melbourne and his former club Essendon. Capping an outstanding first season he was selected to umpire in the finals and officiated in the Geelong-Fremantle elimination final.

On 15 April 2013, Bannister's brother, Rick, was involved in a horse jumping accident which left him a quadriplegic. Jordan umpired the remainder of the 2013 season but announced his retirement in October citing the difficulty of balancing work, family and umpiring; but five months later, after Rick's condition and rehabilitation had improved, Bannister returned to the AFL umpiring panel; Rick died later that year.

Bannister retired from umpiring shortly before the 2017 season, finishing his career having umpired 97 AFL games. Across an AFL career spanning sixteen years, Bannister played and umpired a total of 164 games.

Bannister's father, Wayne Bannister was a boxer who was the Australian welterweight champion.

References

External links

Jordan Bannister's profile on Blueseum

1982 births
Carlton Football Club players
Living people
Essendon Football Club players
Preston Football Club (VFA) players
Australian rules footballers from Melbourne
Calder Cannons players
Australian Football League umpires